Jan Richman is an American poet.

Life
She graduated from the NYU Graduate Creative Writing Program.
 
In 2001, Jan Richman and Beth Lisick presented a benefit "Poetry & Pizza," by 9x9 Industries.  She worked at SF Gate, the online version of the San Francisco Chronicle.  She read at Edinburgh Castle, and Writers With Drinks
Her poems have appeared in The Nation, Ploughshares, Comet, Other Magazine, The Bloomsbury Review, Luna,

In 2001, she co-edited the literary journal 6,500.

Richman taught at the City College of San Francisco, and lives in Oakland, California.

Controversy
From 2001 until 2004, she taught at the Academy of Art University, where there was a controversy about a student composition. 
Alan Kaufman took up the cause of the student's expulsion and Richman's firing by organizing protests against the academy's response. Kaufman was later dismissed from his job at the academy because of his role in leading protests about the controversy.  In support of Kaufman's protest against the student's expulsion, authors Stephen King and Salman Rushdie (at the time, Rushdie was President of the PEN American Center) wrote letters of protest concerning the academy's handling of the matter.

The incident inspired a play Harmless, by Brett Neveu.

Awards
 1994 Walt Whitman Award chosen by Robert Pinsky
 1993 "Discovery"/The Nation Award
 National Endowment for the Arts Fellowship
 Felix Pollack Poetry Prize
 Celia B. Wagner Award.

Works

Books
 Because the Brain Can Be Talked Into Anything (Louisiana State University Press, 1995),
 "Thrill-Bent" (Tupelo Press, 2012)

Non-fiction

Anthologies

Ploughshares

References

External links
 "The Tail Taboo" Commverge Magazine

Year of birth missing (living people)
Living people
21st-century American poets
New York University alumni
20th-century American poets
American women poets
20th-century American women writers
21st-century American women writers
Academy of Art University faculty
American women academics